Wachwa (Quechua for Andean goose, Hispanicized spelling Huachhua) is a mountain in the Andes of Peru, about  high. It is situated in the Lima Region, Huarochiri Province, on the border of the districts of Carampoma and Chicla. Wachwa lies southwest of Ukrupata and Millpu and southeast of the lake named Wachwaqucha (Quechua for "Andean goose lake", Hispanicized and broken name Huachuguacocha).

References 

Mountains of Peru
Mountains of Lima Region